, also known as yab, is a television network headquartered in Yamaguchi City, Yamaguchi Prefecture, Japan.  Yamaguchi Asahi Broadcasting is the third commercial television broadcaster in Yamaguchi Prefecture, it was founded in 1992, and started broadcasting in 1993.  On October 1 2006, yab started broadcasting digital terrestrial television.  

YAB is affiliated with ANN.  TV Asahi and Asahi Shimbun are the top shareholders of yab.  Tokuyama Corporation is the third largest shareholder of yab.

References

External links
 Official website 

All-Nippon News Network
Companies based in Yamaguchi Prefecture
Television stations in Japan
Television channels and stations established in 1992